Youga is  a village in the Zabré Department of Boulgou Province in south-eastern Burkina Faso.
Youga may also refer to:

 Youga (painting), a style of painting
 Youga (surname), a surname
 Youga Dogorou, a Dogon village in Mali